Lecithocera angustiella is a moth in the family Lecithoceridae first described by Kyu-Tek Park in 1999. It is found in Taiwan.

The wingspan is 15–16 mm. The forewings are yellowish white, but dark brown on the costal one fifth. There are two discal spots, inner one is round and the distal one is elongated vertically. The hindwings are pale grey.

Etymology
The species name is derived from the Latin angustus (meaning narrow) and refers to shape of the narrow valva.

References

Moths described in 1999
angustiella